The 2006 Thai Premier League had 12 teams. No clubs would be relegated as the league would be expanded to 16 teams for the 2007 season. Two teams promoted from the rival Pro League and two clubs from Thailand Division 1 League. The official name of the league at this time was Thailand Premier League.

Member clubs

Bangkok Bank
Bangkok University
BEC Tero Sasana
Chonburi (promoted from Provincial League)
Krung Thai Bank
Osotsapa M-150
Port Authority of Thailand
Provincial Electricity Authority
Royal Thai Army (promoted from Division 1)
Suphanburi (promoted from Provincial League)
Thai Honda (promoted from Division 1)
Thailand Tobacco Monopoly

Final league table

Season notes

 In this season, the winner and runner-up of the Provincial League, Chonburi FC and Suphanburi FC began the practice of moving to play in the Thai Premier League.

Kor Royal Cup

The Kor Royal Cup was an end of season match between the two clubs that finished first and second in the final Premier League standings.

Osotsapa, who came second in the Premier League, beat league Champions Bangkok University 2-1.

Queen's Cup

2nd Level Royal Thai Navy upset the odds when they won the 32nd edition of the Queen's Cup defeating Krung Thai Bank 1-0.

Asian representation

League champions and runners up Thailand Tobacco Monopoly and PEA should have taken part in the 2006 Asian Champions League, but both clubs failed to meet the respective time frame to send in squad lists. Both teams were duly disqualified from the competition. Rumor was rife that neither club wished to take part due to the financial costs.
Chonburi reached the final of the Singapore Cup in their first ever participation. They were within one minute of lifting the silverware against Tampines Rovers but succumbed in extra time to lose 3-2. Provincial Electricity Authority also took part in the competition but got knocked out in the first round against Woodlands Wellington.

Annual awards

Coach of the Year

 Somchai Subpherm - Bangkok University

Player of the year

 Punnarat Klinsukon - Bangkok University

Top scorer

 Pipat Thonkanya - 12 GoalsBEC Tero Sasana

Champions
The league champion was Bangkok University. It was the team's first title.

References

Thailand 2006 RSSSF

External links
Official Website

Thai League 1 seasons
Thai
Thai
1